Street Serenade is a 1953 West German musical comedy film directed by Werner Jacobs and starring Vico Torriani, Sybil Werden and Otto Gebühr.

It was made at the Bavaria Studios in Munich. The film's sets were designed by the art directors Franz Bi and Bruno Monden.

Plot
In Naples a famous singer struggling with voice problems hires a struggling street singer to make records in his place.

Cast
Vico Torriani as Mario Monti
Sybil Werden as Wanda Siria
Ellinor Jensen as Nina
Hans Reiser as Luigi
Charles Régnier as Sachetti
Otto Gebühr as Professor Teofilo Sandora
Rolf Wanka as Gino Ferro
Paul Heidemann as Fabio
Maria Sebaldt as Carmela
Walter Janssen as Bartoli

References

External links

1953 musical comedy films
German musical comedy films
West German films
Films directed by Werner Jacobs
Films about singers
Films set in Naples
Films scored by Hans Lang
German black-and-white films
Films shot at Bavaria Studios
1950s German films
1950s German-language films